This is a summary of the electoral history of Mike Moore, Prime Minister of New Zealand (1990), Leader of the Labour Party (1990–93). He was a Member of Parliament for four electorates during his career: Eden, Papanui, Christchurch North, and Waimakariri.

Parliamentary elections

1972 election

1975 election

1978 election

1981 election

1984 election

1987 election

1990 election

1993 election

1996 election

Leadership elections

1983 Deputy-leadership election
First ballot

Second ballot

1989 Leadership election

1990 Leadership election

1993 Leadership election

Party elections

1976 Party Conference

1977 Party Conference

Notes

References

Moore, Mike